Charlotte Thomson Iserbyt was an American freelance writer and former senior policy advisor to the U.S. Department of Education.

Early life and education
She was born in Brooklyn, New York in 1930 and died on February 8, 2022. She attended Dana Hall preparatory school and Katharine Gibbs College in New York City, where she studied business. Iserbyt's father and grandfather were Yale University graduates and members of the Skull and Bones secret society.

Career 
Iserbyt served as the senior policy advisor in the Office of Educational Research and Improvement (OERI), U.S. Department of Education, during the first term of U.S. President Ronald Reagan.

Iserbyt later came across a federally-funded grant entitled Better Education Skills through Technology (Project BEST), part of which was headed "What we (U.S. Dept. of Education) can control and manipulate at the local level". After leaking this document to Human Events, she was removed from her post in the Department of Education.

She later served as a staff employee of the U.S. Department of State (South Africa, Belgium, South Korea).

Since 1999, she has served as President of 3D Research, Co. in Bath, Maine.

Publications 
She is known for writing the book The Deliberate Dumbing Down of America. The book describes how the changes gradually brought into the American public education system work to eliminate the influences of a child's parents, and mold the child into a member of the proletariat in preparation for a socialist-collectivist world of the future.  She considers that these changes originated from plans formulated primarily by the Andrew Carnegie Foundation for the Advancement of Education and Rockefeller General Education Board, and details the psychological methods used to implement and effect the changes.

She also wrote Back to Basics Reform, which documents her experiences working in the U.S. Dept. of Education, where she was privy to past and future plans to restructure American education.

Personal life 

In 1964, Iserbyt married Jan Iserbyt (2 May 1929 – 5 May 2008); they had two sons.

Iserbyt also served as an elected school board member in Camden, Maine 1976–1979, and founded the Maine Conservative Union, an affiliate of the national American Conservative Union, and Guardians of Education for Maine.

Publications
 Back to Basics Reform, or OBE: Skinnerian International Curriculum (1985).
 The Deliberate Dumbing Down of America: A Chronological Paper Trail  (1999). .

See also
 Antony C. Sutton
 John Taylor Gatto

References

 Goodlad, Dr. Professor John. "John Goodlad education". Google Scholar. Various academic publications. Retrieved June 2018.

External links
 Official Blog

American political writers
1930 births
Living people
Gibbs College alumni
Dana Hall School alumni